The 2015 Port Adelaide Football Club season was the club's 136th year in a senior football competition and its 19th season in the AFL.

2015 squad

2015 season

Pre-season

NAB Challenge

Week 1

Week 2

Week 3

AFL season summary

Ladder

References

External links
 Official Website of the AFL

2015
Port Adelaide Football Club